Mindanao State University–Buug is the eight autonomous campus of the Mindanao State University System located in Datu Panas, Buug, Zamboanga Sibugay, Philippines.

History
The Mindanao State University–Buug (MSU-Buug) was established in 1971 as MSU-Buug Community High School.  It was subsidized by MSU-Marawi Campus from 1974 by virtue of BOR Resolution No. 1030.

In 1982, the school was elevated to collegiate level and renamed as MSU-Buug College. It was authorized to offer general college courses by virtue of BOR Resolution Nos. 492 and 492-B, respectively. It was subsequently authorized to offer complete courses in Agriculture, Forestry, Education and Arts through BOR Resolution No. 55, series of 1989.

Despite this elevation into a collegiate unit, MSU Buug operated under its budget as high school entity. It was placed under the direct supervision of the Office of the Assistant Vice Chancellor for Academic Affairs (External Studies). In 2002, by virtue of Special Order No. 581-OP, MSU-Buug was revitalized by the modification of its structure which subsequently transferred the supervision of the Unit to the Office of the Vice Chancellor for Academic Affairs. MSU-Buug then became one of the colleges of Mindanao State University System (MSUS) and such, it was headed by a Director/Dean.

Academics
MSU Buug is composed of eight colleges - the College of Agriculture, College of Arts and Sciences, College of Education, College of Fisheries, College of Forestry and Environmental Studies, College of Hospitality Management, College of Information Technology, and College of Public Affairs; a graduate school (School of Graduate Studies), a senior high school, and a laboratory junior high school (College of Education Training Department).

Graduate school
Master of Arts in Education 
major in School Administration
Master of Arts in Peace and Development Studies

College of Agriculture
Bachelor of Science in Agriculture
major in Agronomy
major in Animal Science
major in Farming Systems
Diploma in Agriculture Technology
major in Crop Production Technology

College of Arts and Sciences
Bachelor in English
Bachelor in Filipino
Bachelor of Science in Nursing

College of Education
Bachelor of Elementary Education
General Education
Bachelor of Secondary Education
major in English
major in Filipino
major in Mathematics
major in Sciences
Professional Education Course

College of Fisheries
Bachelor of Science in Fisheries
Diploma in Fish Technology
major in Aquaculture
major in Fish Processing

College of Forestry and Environmental Studies
Bachelor of Science in Forestry
major in Agro-Forestry
Bachelor of Science in Environmental Science
Forest Ranger Certificate

College of Hospitality Management
Bachelor in Hospitality Management

College of Information Technology
Bachelor of Science in Information Technology

College of Public Affairs
Bachelor in Public Administration
major in Fiscal Administration
major in Human Resource Management
major in Organization and Management

Admission
All freshmen applicants should take and pass the Mindanao State University System Admission and Scholarship Examination (SASE).

References

External links
 MSU - General Santos Official Website 
 MSU - Main Campus Official website 
 MSU - Naawan Campus Official Website

Universities and colleges in Zamboanga Sibugay
State universities and colleges in the Philippines
Mindanao State University